Hillis is both a given name and a surname. Notable people with the name include:

Given name
 Hillis Hadjo (c. 1770–1818), a leader of the Red Stick rebellion of the Creek Indians.
 Hillis Layne (1918–2010), American third baseman in Major League Baseball 
 J. Hillis Miller (1928–2021), American literary critic
 J. Hillis Miller, Sr. (1899–1953), the fourth President of the University of Florida
 Yda Hillis Addis (born 1857), American writer

Surname
 Ali Hillis (born 1978), American actress
 David Hillis (21st century), prominent American herpetologist and systematic biologist
 David Hillis, (1785–1845), American politician
 Danny Hillis (born 1956) is an American inventor, entrepreneur, and scientist
 Dick Hillis (1913–2005), American Protestant Christian missionary to China
 Elwood Hillis (1926–2023), American politician
 Horace Hillis (20th century), American politician
 Ivory O. Hillis Jr. (born 1930), American politician 
 Leo Hillis (1920–2007), Australian rules footballer
 Llewellya Hillis, Canadian-born American marine biologist
 Mack Hillis, Major League Baseball second baseman
 Margaret Hillis (1921–1998), American conductor
 Newell Dwight Hillis (1858–1929), American writer
 Norman Hillis (21st century), Northern Ireland politician
 Peyton Hillis (born 1986), American football fullback
 Rib Hillis (born 1971), American soap opera actor
 Rick Hillis, Canadian poet and short story writer
 Ron Hillis (born 1906), Australian rules footballer
 Stewart Hillis (1943−2014), Scottish physician who held a professorship
 W. Daniel Hillis (born 1956), American inventor, entrepreneur and author
 Wally Hillis (1938–2006), Australian rules footballer